Konrad Tomasz Lewandowski (born 1 April 1966 in Warsaw) (a.k.a. Przewodas) is a fantasy and science fiction writer and journalist, doctor of philosophy, most known for two of his series: a science/political fiction series of adventures of a tabloid journalist Radosław Tomaszewski, and a fantasy series about a werecat Ksin. He wrote four crime fiction novels set in Second Polish Republic featuring chief inspector Jerzy Drwęcki.

In 1995 he received the Janusz A. Zajdel Award for the short story Noteka 2015.

See also
 Science fiction and fantasy in Poland

References

 Konrad T. Lewandowski, biography at gandalf.com.pl

External links
  
  

1966 births
Living people
Polish fantasy writers
Polish science fiction writers
Writers from Warsaw